Va Bank may refer to:

 Va banque, a gambling expression meaning to risk all on one bet
 Va banque (film), a 1920 film
 Va-Bank, the Former Soviet Republic of Georgian licensed version of Deal or No Deal
 Va Banque, the Polish licensed version in the Jeopardy! franchise
 Vabank, a 1981 film